The Municipality of Roblin is a rural municipality (RM) in the Parkland Region of Manitoba, Canada.

Roblin station is located in the municipality.

History

The RM was incorporated as the Municipality of Hillsburg – Roblin – Shell River on January 1, 2015 via the amalgamation of the RMs of Hillsburg and Shell River and the Town of Roblin. It was formed as a requirement of The Municipal Amalgamations Act, which required that municipalities with a population less than 1,000 amalgamate with one or more neighbouring municipalities by 2015. The Government of Manitoba initiated these amalgamations in order for municipalities to meet the 1997 minimum population requirement of 1,000 to incorporate a municipality.

The Manitoba government changed the name of the Municipality of Hillsburg – Roblin – Shell River to the Municipality of Roblin on March 30, 2015. The current Municipality of Roblin has no connection to the former Rural Municipality of Roblin in the Pembina Valley Region.

Communities 
 Bield
 Boggy Creek
 Deepdale
 Makaroff
 Merridale
 Roblin (unincorporated urban community)
 San Clara
 Shevlin
 Shortdale
 Tummel
 Walkerburn
 Zelena

Demographics 

References

External links 

Rural municipalities in Manitoba
2015 establishments in Manitoba
Manitoba municipal amalgamations, 2015
Populated places established in 2015